Chungkur-Kyshtak is a village in Batken Region of Kyrgyzstan. It is part of the Kadamjay District. Its population was 2,240 in 2021.

Nearby villages include Alga and Chimyon (Uzbekistan).

References 

Populated places in Batken Region